Cointegration is a statistical property of a collection  of time series variables. First, all of the series must be integrated of order d (see Order of integration). Next, if a linear combination of this collection is integrated of order less than d, then the collection is said to be co-integrated. Formally, if (X,Y,Z) are each integrated of order d, and there exist coefficients a,b,c such that  is integrated of order less than d, then X, Y, and Z are cointegrated.  Cointegration has become an important property in contemporary time series analysis. Time series often have trends—either deterministic or stochastic. In an influential paper, Charles Nelson and Charles Plosser (1982) provided statistical evidence that many US macroeconomic time series (like GNP, wages, employment, etc.) have stochastic trends.

Introduction
If two or more series are individually  integrated (in the time series sense) but some linear combination of them has a lower order of integration, then the series are said to be cointegrated. A common example is where the individual series are first-order integrated but some (cointegrating) vector of coefficients exists to form a stationary linear combination of them. For instance, a stock market index and the price of its associated futures contract move through time, each roughly following a random walk. Testing the hypothesis that there is a statistically significant connection between the futures price and the spot price could now be done by testing for the existence of a cointegrated combination of the two series.

History
The first to introduce and analyse the concept of spurious—or nonsense—regression was Udny Yule in 1926.
Before the 1980s, many economists used linear regressions on non-stationary time series data, which Nobel laureate Clive Granger and Paul Newbold showed to be a dangerous approach that could produce spurious correlation, since standard detrending techniques can result in data that are still non-stationary. Granger's 1987 paper with Robert Engle formalized the cointegrating vector approach, and coined the term.

For integrated  processes, Granger and Newbold showed that de-trending does not work to eliminate the problem of spurious correlation, and that the superior alternative is to check for co-integration. Two series with  trends can be co-integrated only if there is a genuine relationship between the two. Thus the standard current methodology for time series regressions is to check all-time series involved for integration. If there are  series on both sides of the regression relationship, then it's possible for regressions to give misleading results.

The possible presence of cointegration must be taken into account when choosing a technique to test hypotheses concerning the relationship between two variables having unit roots (i.e. integrated of at least order one). The usual procedure for testing hypotheses concerning the relationship between non-stationary variables was to run ordinary least squares (OLS) regressions on data which had been differenced. This method is biased if the non-stationary variables are cointegrated.

For example, regressing the consumption series for any country (e.g. Fiji) against the GNP for a randomly selected dissimilar country (e.g. Afghanistan) might give a high R-squared relationship (suggesting high explanatory power on Fiji's consumption from Afghanistan's GNP). This is called spurious regression: two integrated  series which are not directly causally related may nonetheless show a significant correlation; this phenomenon is called spurious correlation.

Tests
The six main methods for testing for cointegration are:

Engle–Granger two-step method

In other words:

 

where  is stationary.

If we knew , we could just test it for stationarity with something like a Dickey–Fuller test, Phillips–Perron test and be done.

A second regression is then run on the first differenced variables from the first regression, and the lagged residuals  is included as a regressor.

Johansen test
The Johansen test is a test for cointegration that allows for more than one cointegrating relationship, unlike the Engle–Granger method, but this test is subject to asymptotic properties, i.e. large samples. If the sample size is too small then the results will not be reliable and one should use Auto Regressive Distributed Lags (ARDL).

Phillips–Ouliaris cointegration test
Peter C. B. Phillips and Sam Ouliaris (1990) show that residual-based unit root tests applied to the estimated cointegrating residuals do not have the usual Dickey–Fuller distributions under the null hypothesis of no-cointegration. Because of the spurious regression phenomenon under the null hypothesis, the distribution of these tests have asymptotic distributions that depend on (1) the number of deterministic trend terms and (2) the number of variables with which co-integration is being tested. These distributions are known as Phillips–Ouliaris distributions and critical values have been tabulated. In finite samples, a superior alternative to the use of these asymptotic critical value is to generate critical values from simulations.

Multicointegration
In practice, cointegration is often used for two  series, but it is more generally applicable and can be used for variables integrated of higher order (to detect correlated accelerations or other second-difference effects). Multicointegration extends the cointegration technique beyond two variables, and occasionally to variables integrated at different orders.

Variable shifts in long time series
Tests for cointegration assume that the cointegrating vector is constant during the period of study. In reality, it is possible that the long-run relationship between the underlying variables change (shifts in the cointegrating vector can occur). The reason for this might be technological progress, economic crises, changes in the people's preferences and behaviour accordingly, policy or regime alteration, and organizational or institutional developments. This is especially likely to be the case if the sample period is long. To take this issue into account, tests have been introduced for cointegration with one unknown structural break, and tests for cointegration with two unknown breaks are also available.

Bayesian inference 
Several Bayesian methods have been proposed to compute the posterior distribution of the number of cointegrating relationships and the cointegrating linear combinations.

See also
 Error correction model
 Granger causality
 Stationary subspace analysis

References

Further reading
 
 
 
  An intuitive introduction to cointegration.

Mathematical finance
Time series